In commerce, a "third-party source" means a supplier (or service provider) who is not directly controlled by either the seller (first party) nor the customer/buyer (second party) in a business transaction. The third party is considered independent from the other two, even if hired by them, because not all control is vested in that connection. There can be multiple third-party sources with respect to a given transaction, between the first and second parties. A second-party source would be under direct control of the second party in the transaction.

In Information Technology, a "third-party source" is a supplier of software (or a computer accessory) which is independent of the supplier and customer of the major computer product(s).

In E-commerce, "3rd Party (3P) source" refers to a seller who publishes products on a marketplace, without this marketplace to own or physically carry those products. When an order comes in, a 3P seller has the item on hand and fulfills it. An example of 3P sellers are merchants participating in Amazon's FBM program.

See also 
 Third party
 Computing platform
 Tertiary source

References 

Business terms
Sources